The Federal Football League was an Australian rules football competition in the south-eastern suburbs of Melbourne, Victoria, that was in existence from 1909 to 1981. It was regarded as one of the strongest metropolitan leagues in Melbourne and in the 1960s and it is said that Channel Seven were seeking to telecast league games on a Sunday.

Formation
Formed in 1909 as the Federal Football Association, the competition's eight founding members were Cheltenham, Ellindale, Elsternwick, Frankston, Mentone, Mordialloc, Moorabbin, and Glen Huntly,  all from the southern/south eastern suburbs.

Local Councillor F. T. Le Page was elected president.

History

In 1915, the Federal football Association (FFA) A. Grade teams were - Brighton District, Moorabbin, Cheltenham, Moorabbin Park, Oakleigh and Elsternwick, whilst the B. Grade clubs were Sandringham, Mentone, Heatherton and Glenhuntly. 

In 1925, the FFA comprised 10 senior and 9 junior club's and had over 1,000 registered players. 

In 1933, J Nolan kicked 116 goals for the Caulfield.

In 1937 the A Section competition teams where composed of - Black Rock, Mordialloc, Cheltenham, East Burwood, Moorabbin, Caulfield, Darling and Mentone, and in the B section, Chelsea, Highett, Mt. Waverley, Mordialloc, Black Rock and Edithvale-Aspendale.

Middle Brighton FC kicked 50.40 - 340 v Heatherton: 0.0 - 0 in a match in 1914.

Clubs

A. Grade Football Premiers / Runners Up
The Agar Wynne Shield. The Honourable Agar Wynne, MHR was the Federal Football Association's Patron from 1909 to 1915.

1909 – Cheltenham	6.6.42 d Ellindale 2.12.24		
1910 – Victorian Brewery 10.12.72 d Mordialloc 5.9.39		
1911 – Cheltenham	12.14.86 d Moorabbin 4.7.31		
1912 – Victorian Brewery 6.10.46 d Moorabbin 2.12 - 24			
1913 – Cheltenham	9.9.63 d Middle Brighton 7.10.52
1914 – Moorabbin 5.10.40 d Cheltenham 2.7.19		
1915 – Brighton Districts 9.8.62 d Cheltenham 6.8.44 		
1916 to 1918 - Federal FL in recess due to World War I
1919 – Sandringham Amateurs 6.13.49 d Black Rock 6.10.46 	
1920 – Brighton Districts 7.7.49 d Hampton	6.10.46		
1921 – Brighton Districts 8.12.60 d Black Rock 7.9.51  	
1922 – Cheltenham	5.10.40 v Mordialloc 4.14.38 
1923 – Mordialloc 10.9.69 d Black Rock 2.9.21  
1924 – Mordialloc	6.16.52 d Mentone 4.7.31 	(Mordialloc undefeated premiers)
1925 – Cheltenham	9.6.60 d Mordialloc 5.21.51
1926 – Moorabbin 13.11.89 d Mordialloc 9.17 - 71		
1927 – Moorabbin 9.11.65 d Middle Brighton 6.9.45	
1928 – Mentone 6.14.50 d Moorabbin 5.15.45		
1929 – Mordialloc	13.12.90 d Mentone 7.3.45	
1930 – Moorabbin 6.11.47 d Mordialloc 5.16.46 		
1931 – Moorabbin 9.9.63 d Mordialloc 8.7.55	
1932 – East Burwood	13.14.92 d Mentone 11.4.70		
1933 – Moorabbin 10.26.86 d Mordialloc 10.18.78	
1934 – Cheltenham 13.12.90 d Mordialloc 8.13.61
1935 – Black Rock 14.11.95 d East Burwood 11.12.78
1936 – Black Rock 14.9.93 d Darling 12.14.86
1937 – Darling 9.14.68 d Moorabbin 7.12.54
1938 – Darling 9.17.71 d Mordialloc 9.13.67
1939 – Mordialloc 14.9.93 d Moorabbin 12.13.85
1940 – Moorabbin 11.15.81 d Cheltenham 7.14.56
1941 – Moorabbin 18.16.124 d Cheltenham 11.11.77	
1942 to 1944 - Federal FL in recess due to World War II
1945 – Moorabbin 14.19.103 d Camden 10.5.65		
1946 – Moorabbin 18.17.125 d Cheltenham 9.17.71	
1947 – Moorabbin 15.16.106 d Mordialloc 11.13.79
		
1948 – Moorabbin 19.11.125 d Camden 10.5.65	
1949 - Caulfield 11.15.81 drew Moorabbin 11.15.81
1949 – Caulfield 14.10.94 d Moorabbin 11.10.76 (Grand Final Replay)
1950 – Mordialloc	9.9.63 d Moorabbin 7.14.56		
1951 – Mordialloc 21.17.143 d Freighters 6.8.44		
1952 – Mordialloc 14.7.91 d Camden 10.13.73	
1953 – Dandenong 11.20.86 d Caulfield 9.6.60
1954 – Black Rock 16.17.113 d Dandenong 15.12.102
1955 – Chelsea 10.17.77 d Dandenong 7.12.54	
1956 – Mentone	11.8.74	d Mordialloc 9.11.65	
1957 – McKinnon 13.9.87 d Mordialloc 12.13.85			
1958 – McKinnon 8.12.60 d Springvale 6.9.45		
1959 – McKinnon 8.13.61 d Mentone 8.9.57			
1960 – Springvale 14.9.93 d McKinnon 8.16.64
1961 – Springvale 12.8.80 d Glen Huntly 10.11.71	
1962 – Springvale 14.13.97	d Glen Huntly 7.12.54	
1963 – Springvale 17.16.118 d Mentone 8.13.61		
1964 – East Malvern 8.18.66 d Glen Huntly 7.9.51		
1965 – Springvale 15.13.103 Glen Huntly 3.12.30	
1966 – East Malvern 13.13.91 d Springvale 11.13.79			
1967 – Mentone 14.10.94 d Glen Huntly 11.9.75		
1968 – Mentone 6.17.53 d Oakleigh District 5.13.43		
1969 – East Malvern 8.10.58 d Oakleigh District 6.20.56			
1970 – East Malvern 20.12.132 d Springvale 15.21.111		
1971 – Highett 17.10.112 d Springvale 12.7.79		
1972 – Noble Park	15.16.106 d Highett 14.9.93	
1973 – Highett 17.19.121 d Noble Park 16.14.110	
1974 – Highett 11.15.81 d Cheltenham	11.14.80	
1975 – Springvale 20.14.134 d Parkdale 16.13.109		
1976 – Mentone 12.17.89 d Cheltenham 12.11.83		
1977 – Springvale 18.19.127 d Oakleigh District 17.13.115	
1978 – Parkdale 22.19.141 d Oakleigh District 15.17.107		
1979 – Highett 14.12.96 d Clayton  11.13.79	
1980 – Clayton 17.30.132 d Springvale 13.14.92		
1981 – Clayton 16.9.105 d Oakleigh District 11.13.79

Best and Fairest Awards
Senior Football / A. Grade Section
Cr. J.W. ALLNUT MEDAL. (Allnut was President of the FFA from 1936 to 1945 & a life member).

References

Links
History of the Federal FL - 1909 to 1981
Federal FL Premiership Lists
1909 - Federal Football Association Premiers: Cheltenham FC team photo
Federal FL Premiership Photos

Defunct Australian rules football competitions in Victoria (Australia)
Sports leagues established in 1909
1909 establishments in Australia
1981 disestablishments in Australia